Jhajjar Assembly constituency is one of the 90 assembly constituencies of Haryana a northern state of India. It is also part of Rohtak Lok Sabha constituency. It is a reserved seat for the Scheduled Castes.

Members of Legislative Assembly

Before division of Punjab
1952: Chaudhary Chand Ram, INC
1957: Sher Singh, INC

After creation of Haryana
1967: M. Singh, Independent
 1968: Ganga Sagar, Indian National Congress
 1972: Manphul Singh, Indian National Congress (Organisation)
 1977: Mange Ram, Janata Party
 1987: Medhavi, Independent
 1991: Daryav Khatik, Janata Party
 1996: Ram Parkash Dahiya, Haryana Vikas Party
1996: Kanta Devi, (Haryana Vikas Party)
 2005: Hari Ram, Indian National Congress
 2009: Geeta Bhukkal, Indian National Congress
 2014: Geeta Bhukkal, Indian National Congress
 2019: Geeta Bhukkal, Indian National Congress

See also
 Jhajjar
 List of constituencies of the Haryana Legislative Assembly

References

Assembly constituencies of Haryana
Jhajjar
Jhajjar district